Stenochiinae is a subfamily of darkling beetles in the family Tenebrionidae. There are more than 390 genera in Stenochiinae.

See also
 List of Stenochiinae genera

References

Further reading

External links

 

Tenebrionidae